Under the Covers, Vol. 2 is the second collaboration between alternative rock artist Matthew Sweet and Bangles singer/guitarist Susanna Hoffs. Released by Shout! Factory on July 21, 2009, it contains 16 cover versions of songs from the 1970s.

Track listing

The Deluxe Edition contains another ten tracks:

Personnel

 Matthew Sweet – vocals, guitars, bass
 Susanna Hoffs – vocals, guitar
 Ric Menck – drums
 Greg Leisz – guitar
 Lindsey Buckingham – guitars on "Second Hand News"
 Steve Howe – guitars on "I've Seen All Good People: Your Move/All Good People"
 Dhani Harrison – guitars on "Beware of Darkness"

References

External links
 Official Myspace site
 Bangles News Release

2009 albums
Matthew Sweet albums
Susanna Hoffs albums
Covers albums
Collaborative albums
Shout! Factory albums
Albums produced by Matthew Sweet
Sequel albums